Coldblow Col is a snow-covered col at  elevation, between Echo Mountain and the Cragsman Peaks on Coronation Island, in the South Orkney Islands. It was surveyed in 1950 by the Falkland Islands Dependencies Survey (FIDS). The name derives from the fact that a FIDS party had their tent blown down in a gale when camped on this col in September 1948.

References
 

Mountain passes of Antarctica
Landforms of the South Orkney Islands